Nathan-melech is described as one of Josiah's officials in 2 Kings 23:11 of the Hebrew Bible. He lived near the entrance to the temple, close to the courtyard where King Solomon had kept chariot-horses used to worship the Moabite sun-god Chemosh. Josiah eventually disposed of the horses and chariots.

Archeology
In March 2019, a clay bulla dated to the middle of the seventh or beginning of the sixth century BC was found in the Givati Parking Lot dig excavation in the City of David area of Jerusalem bearing the inscription, "(belonging) to Nathan-melech, servant of the king". The wording on the seal was deciphered by Anat Mendel-Geberovich of the Hebrew University of Jerusalem and the Center for the Study of Ancient Jerusalem.

References

7th-century BCE Jews